La Grange Independent School District is a public school district based in La Grange, Texas (US). As of 2019, the district's superintendent is William (Bill) Wagner, and the assistant superintendent is Stacy Eilers.

The district serves the city of La Grange and unincorporated areas in Fayette County, including Winchester.

In 2009, the school district was rated "academically acceptable" by the Texas Education Agency.

Schools
All schools are located in the city of La Grange, TX.
La Grange High School – Grades 9–12; Principal: John Pineda; Assistant Principal: Brad Harbers
La Grange Middle School – Grades 7–8; Principal: Dr. Sarah Otto; Assistant Principal: Regina Walker
Hermes/Intermediate School – Grades PK-6; Principal: Lauren Almanza; Assistant Principals: Stephanie Jurek and Dawn Given

Bond 2017 
On May 6, 2017, voters approved the district's $37.9 million bond proposal, which included new elementary facilities, a band hall addition for MS/HS, and a dual credit center renovation.

For more information regarding Bond 2017, click here

References

External links
La Grange ISD

School districts in Fayette County, Texas